The Russo-Khivan War of 1839–1840 was a failed Russian attempt to conquer the Khanate of Khiva. Vasily Perovsky set out from Orenburg with 5,000 men, met an unusually cold winter, lost most of his camels, and was forced to turn back after going halfway.

Russians attacked Khiva four times. Around 1602, some free Cossacks made three raids on Khiva. In 1717, Alexander Bekovich-Cherkassky attacked Khiva and was soundly defeated, only a few men escaping to tell the tale. After the Russian defeat in 1839–1840, Khiva was finally conquered by the Russians during the Khivan campaign of 1873.

Background

The Khanate of Khiva was south of the Aral Sea in the delta of the Oxus River.  Here irrigation supported a population of about half a million. The problem was that Khiva was an oasis surrounded by several hundred miles of steppe and desert. The Russians could easily defeat the Khivan army but they first had to move enough troops across the steppe.

By about 1743 Russia had established itself on the Orenburg Line about 750 miles north of Khiva. Orenburg was long the base from which Russia watched and tried to control the steppes to the east and south. Over the next century they gained increasing control over the Kazakh nomads. There were the usual border disputes on a lawless frontier. The Russians complained that the Khan did not do enough to stop raiders, although his ability to control them was limited. A second problem was slavery. Khiva kept many Persian slaves which they bought from the Turkomans. A small number of Russians were also taken from the Orenburg Line. From the early nineteenth century an increasing number of Russian fishermen were captured on the Caspian Sea.  After other attempts to pressure the Khan had failed, in August 1836 Russia ordered the arrest of all Khivan merchants in Russian territory – about 572 people and 1,400,000 silver rubles in goods. The Khan was told that his subjects would be released when all Russian slaves were released. In late September the Khan said he would release his Russians, but when the caravan arrived there were only 25, almost all old men who had been in slavery for 30 or 40 years. Five more were released in 1838 and 80 more in August 1839. On 24 March 1839 the czar approved an attack on Khiva. The goal was not annexation but, if possible, to replace the current Khan with a Kazakh loyal to Russia. The final plan was approved on 10 October.

Preparations
The land around Khiva has enough grass and water to support a thin nomadic population, but not enough for an army. The troops would have to carry nearly everything with them. As one moves south, grass and water diminish, as did Russian knowledge of the ground, an important matter for an army marching from one waterhole to the next. Since the grass died down in summer, spring and autumn were the best times for travel. Winter was sometimes preferred to reduce the need for water. Winter snow and cold are not too bad in normal years, but 1839 was not a normal year.

5000 men would be used, 3000 for the actual fighting and 2000 to guard the supply line. Orenburg was chosen as the starting point, since this was the main base and had connections to the Russian heartland. Additional supplies would be taken by sea to Novo Alexandrovsk and carried east to the main column. 7750 Bashkir carts were mobilized to haul supplies to Orenburg. 10400 camels and 2000 camel drivers were requisitioned from the Kazakhs. This required military force in the case of one tribe.  In June Colonel Heke went south with two companies and 1200 carts to explore the route and establish advanced depots. He reached the Emba River on 30 June and sent a smaller group forward to establish the next depot. The Aq Bulaq River 100 miles south was chosen and a fort was built there in August.  A large amount of hay was mown and reeds and willows were collected for fuel. For 40 kilometers north of Aq Bulaq there were salt marshes with no adequate water or grass.  By September a fort had been built on the Emba and hay mown. Fort Emba had a garrison of 634 men and Aq Bulaq 399. The forts were unhealthy and by December 93 men had died. On the first of November a caravan of 1128 camels left Orenburg and reached the Emba 24 days later.

Campaign
Some officers thought that it was too late in the season but the campaign proceeded anyway.  On 26 November the first column left Orenburg. Three more columns left a day or two apart. The first snow fell on 2 December. On 18 December the mercury in the thermometers congealed (minus 35 Fahrenheit). The first snow storm struck on the 19th. They reached the Emba on 31 December with no deaths but numerous cases of frostbite. In the previous 27 days the temperature never rose above 12 degrees Fahrenheit.

On 30 December 2,000 to 3,000 Khivans attacked Aq Bulaq. After 2 unsuccessful days they turned their attention to a supply column 17 kilometers away. When this also failed they withdrew. The Russians lost 5 killed and 13 wounded. Eighty Khivan bodies were counted. About this time some of the Kazakh camel drivers staged a mutiny. After two ringleaders were shot the rest returned to duty. (One writer says that the camel drivers knew the country and correctly guessed that the expedition would fail, something that Perovsky was forced to admit a month later,) Also about this time word was received from the Caspian. The supply ships had been delayed by contrary winds and had become frozen in, only two limping back to Astrakhan. Those frozen near Novo Alexandrovsk were unloaded. Those further away were burnt by a group sent from Khiva. This group then attacked those Kazakhs who were working with the Russians, thereby cutting off the supply of fresh camels. In November Aitov was sent to collect camels to haul supplies from the Caspian to Fort Emba. Returning with 538 camels his camel drivers revolted, returned the camels to their owners and sent Aitov to Khiva.  By 13 January there were 202 sick on the Emba and one fifth of the camels were too weak to be used.

In January the columns began leaving Fort Emba, the main one reaching Aq Bulak on 6 February, covering about 100 miles in 16 days. The temperature was well below zero Fahrenheit. Men had to walk in front of the camels to clear a path through the snow.  Between the Emba and Ak Bulaq 1200 camels died and about 2500 had to be abandoned due to exhaustion. Unnecessary supplies were burnt for fuel. The cold made it impossible to wash or change clothes.  In early February Bizyanov was sent about 100 miles south and reported the snow was even deeper.  Of the 2750 Orenburg Infantry, who were not used to campaigning, only two thirds were fit for duty and 236 had died. Given the rate of loss of men and camels it was clear that if the army reached Khiva it would be in no condition to fight. 
On 13 February  Perovsky decided to retreat.

All four columns were back on the Emba by the end of February. The temperature remained below zero Fahrenheit. Roots were dug up for fuel and supplies were burned for heat. Since all the grass around Fort Emba had been consumed and there were many dead camels that would begin to rot in spring, Fort Emba was moved to a new location about 30 kilometers away.  Cossacks were sent out to obtain more camels. 500 were secured by negotiation. 700 were sent from Orenburg. Bizyanov attacked the Adaev tribe at mouth of the Emba, killed 450 men, and brought back a large number of camels.  By mid-May there were 3480 camels. At this time there were 1130 men sick in camp, 613 with scurvy. The troops began leaving the Emba on 30 May, encountered nothing worse than mud and by late June were dispersed along the Orenburg Line.

Results: 1054 Russians died out of the original 5000. Deaths of Kazakh camel drivers are not given. Bashkir carters lost 199 men and 8869 horses. The expedition cost 1.7 million rubles. Economic losses to the Bashkirs and Kazakhs were estimated at 2.5 million rubles each.  Of the original 10500 camels only 1500 remained alive by April.  During the campaign there were 3124 cases of sickness, 608 of them mortal. It was noted that the death rate for the Ural Cossacks was 1 in 200 and among the Orenburg Infantry 1 in 14, the difference being ascribed to habituation to steppe campaigning. The following year a British agent convinced the Khan to free 416 Russian slaves. The Khivan traders and their goods were released. Perovsky retained his command and in 1853 won the battle of Ak Mechet. Khiva was finally subjugated by the Khivan campaign of 1873.

See also
 Russian conquest of Turkestan
 First Anglo-Afghan War

Source and notes

Anonymous, "A Narrative of the Russian Military Expedition to Khiva under General Perofski", Translated from the Russian for the Foreign Department of the Government of India, Calcutta, 1867
Morrison, Alexander, "The Russian Conquest of Central Asia", 2021, Chapter 2
notes:

Great Game
Conflicts in 1839
Conflicts in 1840
Khanate of Khiva
Wars involving Russia
Central Asia in the Russian Empire